Robert Donald McLean (born January 19, 1954) is a Canadian retired professional ice hockey defenceman who played nine games in the National Hockey League (NHL) with the Washington Capitals.

Career 
McLean was drafted by the Philadelphia Flyers at the 1974 NHL amateur draft and the New England Whalers at the 1974 WHA Amateur Draft. He played nine games in the National Hockey League (NHL) with the Washington Capitals during the 1975–76 season.

External links

Profile at hockeydraftcentral.com

1954 births
Canadian ice hockey defencemen
Ice hockey people from Ontario
Johnstown Jets players
Living people
New England Whalers draft picks
Niagara Falls Flyers players
Philadelphia Flyers draft picks
Richmond Robins players
Salt Lake Golden Eagles (CHL) players
Sportspeople from Niagara Falls, Ontario
Sudbury Wolves players
Washington Capitals players
Canadian expatriate ice hockey players in the United States